Al-Samʿānī may refer to:

Aḥmad Samʿānī (d. 1140), Arab theologian who wrote in Persian
Ibn al-Samʿānī (d. 1166), nephew of prec., biographer who wrote in Arabic